The men's light middleweight (71 kg/156.2 lbs) K-1 category at the W.A.K.O. World Championships 2007 in Belgrade was the sixth lightest of the K-1 tournaments, involving twelve fighters all based in Europe.  Each of the matches was three rounds of two minutes each and were fought under K-1 rules.

Owing to the low number of fighters for a sixteen-man tournament, four of the contestants had byes through to the quarter finals.  The tournament winner was Belarus's Dmitry Valent who won gold by defeating his Russian opponent Rizvan Isaev.  Semi finalists Djime Coulibaly from France and Italian Manuele Raini were rewarded for the efforts with bronze medals.

Results

See also
List of WAKO Amateur World Championships
List of WAKO Amateur European Championships
List of male kickboxers

References

External links
 WAKO World Association of Kickboxing Organizations Official Site

Kickboxing events at the WAKO World Championships 2007 Belgrade
2007 in kickboxing
Kickboxing in Serbia